The Corpus Christi Caller-Times is the newspaper of record for Corpus Christi, Texas.

History

There has been a newspaper in Corpus Christi for almost as long as there has been a town. In 1883, the Caller was started in a frame building at 310 North Chaparral, now the site of Green's Jewelers. Roy Miller was editor of the Caller 1907–1911, when it was an enterprise of the King Ranch; he sold his interest in it in 1929. Later, there was a newspaper called the Times. Both were located on North Chaparral in 1920. In the late 1920s, the two were combined to become the Caller-Times. The present building was erected in 1935 at 820 North Lower Broadway and has subsequently been remodeled and enlarged several times. The most recent addition was completed in 1994 when a new Goss Metroliner offset press was installed in a $10 million expansion.

Another milestone was reached in August 1995 – the Internet edition of Caller-Times was launched. The site was re-designed and renamed caller.com in 1998.

Caller.com was redesigned and relaunched with a new platform in November 2001. The site remained mostly the same until May 2007 when it launched a new design and layout.

On October 15, 1997, the paper itself, long owned by Harte-Hanks Communications, was taken over by the Scripps Howard group.

In the early days, the paper cost just a few cents and until well after World War II, was delivered on bicycles. In 1939 the Caller-Times employed 100 people. Currently, there are nearly 100 full and part-time employees working at the Caller-Times.

Awards

The Caller-Times and Caller.com have consistently been recognized for quality. In 2001, Caller-Times was named Best Daily Newspaper by the Press Club of Dallas in a 5-state competition area. Staff also won 9 other "Katies." The Caller-Times has been chosen best newspaper in the 100,000 and under circulation category nine of the 13 years the category has been judged and was runner-up three of the other four years.

The newspaper in the news

The Caller-Times was the first source to report on U.S. Vice President Dick Cheney's hunting accident. The accident took place in the early evening of Saturday, February 11, 2006. Katharine Armstrong, the owner of the ranch on which the accident took place, waited until the next morning to inform the Caller-Times.

References

External links

Mass media in Corpus Christi, Texas
Gannett publications
Daily newspapers published in Texas